The Return of Pom Pom (Chinese: 雙龍出海) is a 1984 Hong Kong comedy film directed by Philip Chan and starring Richard Ng and John Shum. It is the second film in the Pom Pom film series which is a spin-off the Lucky Stars series.

Plot
Having been together for years, police officer Beethoven (John Shum) must find a new place to live as his friend and fellow officer Ng Ah Chow (Richard Ng) is marrying his fiancée Anna (Deanie Yip). Furthermore, the two officers are transferred to a new department run by fearsome Inspector Tien (James Tin Chuen). While here their former boss inspector Chan (Philip Chan) is set up after evidence is stolen by "The Flying Spider" (Lam Ching-ying), the two officers must track down the thief to prove Chan's innocence.

Cast
 Richard Ng as officer Ng Ah Chiu
 John Shum as officer Beethoven
 Deannie Yip as Anna, Ng's love interest
 Lam Ching-Ying as The Flying Spider
 Philip Chan as Inspector Chan
 James Tin Chuen as Inspector Tien

References

External links
 
 

1980s Cantonese-language films
Hong Kong comedy films
1984 comedy films
1984 films
Films directed by Philip Chan
1980s Hong Kong films